Don Barrington is an American politician in the U.S. state of Oklahoma. He served in the Oklahoma Senate, representing District 31 from 2004 to 2016, which includes Comanche, Cotton, Jefferson and portions of Tillman and Stephens Counties.

In 2015, Barrington proposed a bill to criminalize wearing a "robe, mask or other disguise" in public that would "intentionally conceal the wearer's identity", which was criticized as an attempt to criminalize the wearing of the hoodie.

References

External links
Senator Don Barrington - District 31 official State Senate website
Project Vote Smart - Don Barrington profile
Barrington, Don R Follow The Money

1947 births
Living people
People from Pryor Creek, Oklahoma
Republican Party Oklahoma state senators
21st-century American politicians